The Diocese of Birmingham in Alabama is a Latin Church ecclesiastical territory or diocese of the Catholic Church that encompasses the northern 39 counties of the U.S. state of Alabama. It was erected on December 9, 1969, when it was split from what is now the Archdiocese of Mobile. The Diocese of Birmingham in Alabama is suffragan diocese in the ecclesiastical province of the metropolitan Archdiocese of Mobile.

The Cathedral of Saint Paul, in Birmingham, Alabama serves as the Episcopal see of the Diocese of Birmingham in Alabama. EWTN, a major Catholic media enterprise, has its studios in the borders of the Diocese of Birmingham in Alabama.

History
Pope Paul VI erected the Diocese of Birmingham, with territory taken from the Diocese of Mobile-Birmingham, on 28 June 1969, simultaneously renaming the mother diocese to Diocese of Mobile.

On 29 July 1980, Pope John Paul II elevated the Diocese of Mobile to a metropolitan archdiocese and designated the Diocese of Birmingham as one of its suffragans.

Reports of sexual abuse
In 2004, four priests accused of sexual abuse who were serving in the Diocese of Birmingham agreed to pay a settlement of $45,000 to eleven of their victims. In December 2018, then-Birmingham Bishop Robert J. Baker released of list of six clergy who were accused of committing acts of sex abuse while serving the Diocese of Birmingham. Bishop Baker also acknowledged the abuse committed by these six priests, stating that "they committed these deplorable acts,” and apologized. Five were removed from ministry and one died. One accused priest who was later acquitted, Francis Mary Stone, was also revealed to have maintained his clerical status after violating his vow of celibacy and also fathering a child with an employee at EWTN while serving as a host of the network's show Life on the Rock. After these revelations were made public, Stone was initially suspended from public ministry.

Bishops

Bishops of Birmingham
 Joseph Gregory Vath (1969–1987)
 Raymond James Boland (1988–1993), appointed Bishop of Kansas City-Saint Joseph
 David Edward Foley (1994–2005)
 Robert Joseph Baker (2007–2020)
 Steven John Raica (2020–present)

Other priests of the diocese who became bishops
William McDermott, appointed Auxiliary Bishop of Huancavélica in Peru in 1976
Joseph Marino, appointed Titular Archbishop in 2008, later President of the Pontifical Ecclesiastical Academy

Elementary schools
 Anniston:   Sacred Heart School  |  3K-8
 Bessemer:   St. Aloysius School  |  3K-8
 Birmingham: Holy Family Catholic Academy  |  3K-8 (Operated Independent of Diocese)
 Birmingham: Our Lady of Fatima   |  4K-8
 Birmingham: Our Lady of Sorrows   |  3K-8
 Birmingham: Our Lady of the Valley Catholic School  |  3K-8
 Birmingham: St. Barnabas   |  4K-8
 Birmingham: St. Francis Xavier   |  5K-8
 Birmingham: St. Rose Academy   |  4K-8 (Operated Independent of Diocese)
 Cullman: Sacred Heart, Cullman  |  3K-6
 Decatur: St. Ann School   |  3K-8
 Florence: St. Joseph Regional School   |  3K-8
 Gadsden: St. James School   |  3K-8
 Hoover: Prince of Peace   |  3K-8
 Huntsville: Holy Family Regional School    |  4K-8
 Huntsville: Holy Spirit Regional School    |  5K-8
 Madison: St. John the Baptist    |  4K-8
 Tuscaloosa: Holy Spirit Catholic School    |  3K-6

High schools
 Birmingham: John Carroll Catholic High School
 Birmingham: Holy Family Cristo Rey High School (Operated Independent of Diocese)
 Cullman: St. Bernard Preparatory School (Operated Independent of Diocese)
 Huntsville: Pope John Paul II Catholic High School
 McClellan:  Sacred Heart of Jesus Catholic School
 Tuscaloosa: Holy Spirit High School

See also

 Catholic Church by country
 Catholic Church hierarchy
 List of the Catholic dioceses of the United States

References

External links 
 Roman Catholic Diocese of Birmingham Official Site

 
Christian organizations established in 1969
Catholic Church in Alabama
Birmingham Alabama
Birmingham
Birmingham
Organizations based in Birmingham, Alabama